Jan Śniadecki (29 August 1756 – 9 November 1830) was a Polish mathematician, philosopher, and astronomer at the turn of the 18th and 19th centuries.

Life

Born in Żnin, Śniadecki studied at Kraków Jagellonian University and in Paris. He was rector of the Imperial University of Vilnius, a member of the Commission of National Education, and director of astronomical observatories at Kraków  and Vilnius. He died at Jašiūnai Manor near Vilnius.

Śniadecki published many works, including his observations on recently discovered planetoids. His O rachunku losów (On the Calculation of Chance, 1817) was a work in probability.

He was brother to Jędrzej Śniadecki.

Honours 

The lunar crater Sniadecki and the main-belt asteroid 1262 Sniadeckia were named in his honour.

Works 
 "Rachunku algebraicznego teoria" (1783)
 "Geografia, czyli opisanie matematyczne i fizyczne ziemi" (1804)
 "Rozprawa o Koperniku" (Discourse on Nicolaus Copernicus, biography, 1802)
 "O rachunku losów" (1817)
 "Trygonometria kulista analitycznie wyłożona" (1817)
 "O pismach klasycznych i romantycznych", Dziennik Wileński (1819)
 "Filozofia umysłu ludzkiego" (1821)

See also
 History of philosophy in Poland
 List of Poles

References

 Władysław Tatarkiewicz, Historia filozofii (History of Philosophy), 3 vols., Warsaw, Państwowe Wydawnictwo Naukowe, 1978.

External links
 Works by Jan Śniadecki in digital library Polona

1756 births
1830 deaths
19th-century Polish astronomers
Lithuanian astronomers
18th-century Polish–Lithuanian mathematicians
19th-century Polish mathematicians
18th-century Polish–Lithuanian philosophers
19th-century Polish philosophers
Enlightenment philosophers
Rectors of Vilnius University
People from Żnin County
18th-century Polish–Lithuanian astronomers